Nina's Journey is a 2005 Polish-Swedish drama film written and directed by Lena Einhorn. The film won the Guldbagge Award for Best Film and Best Screenplay at the 41st Guldbagge Awards.

Story
The film is based on the real-life story of writer-director Lena Einhorn’s mother, Nina Rajmic. When war broke out and the Nazis invaded, the family was moved to an apartment in the Warsaw ghetto. Interviews are interspersed with dramatised segments showing her life as a young girl.

Cast
 Agnieszka Grochowska as Nina Rajmic
 Maria Chwalibóg as Fanny
 Andrzej Brzeski as Artur Rajmic
 Pawel Iwanicki as Rudek Rajmic

References

External links
 
 

2005 films
2005 drama films
Polish drama films
2000s Polish-language films
Swedish drama films
2000s Swedish-language films
Best Film Guldbagge Award winners
2005 multilingual films
Polish multilingual films
Swedish multilingual films
2000s Swedish films